Janet Harvey (born March 28, 1967 in Winnipeg, Manitoba) is a Canadian curler.

In 1984, Harvey played second for Darcy Kirkness at that year's Canadian Junior Curling Championships. The team won the tournament, however there were no Worlds for women until 1988.

In 1986, Harvey returned to the Canadian Juniors as a skip, but lost in the semifinal to Newfoundland's Jill Noseworthy. 

Since then, Harvey has been to three Scott Tournament of Hearts, (1990, 1997 and 2006) all as a skip, failing to make the playoffs at each one.

Grand Slam record
Harvey had played in every single Manitoba Liquor & Lotteries Women's Classic since it became a Grand Slam before finally  making the playoffs for the first time in 2013.

Former events

Sources
World Curling Tour Profile
Scotties Tournament of Hearts Statistics

Canadian women curlers
Curlers from Winnipeg
Living people
1967 births
Canada Cup (curling) participants